P. Naidu Palem is a village in Chimakurthi mandal, located in Prakasam district of Andhra Pradesh, India.

References

Villages in Prakasam district